Gabriela Patricia Chávez (born 9 April 1989) is an Argentine footballer who plays as a midfielder for Boca Juniors and the Argentina women's national team.

International career
Chávez represented Argentina at two FIFA U-20 Women's World Cup editions (2006 and the 2008). At senior level, she played the 2006 South American Women's Football Championship, two Pan American Games editions (2007 and 2011), the 2007 FIFA Women's World Cup, the 2008 Summer Olympics and the 2018 Copa América Femenina.

See also
 Argentina at the 2008 Summer Olympics

References

External links
 
http://www.altomfotball.no/element.do?cmd=player&personId=199021&tournamentId=1150&seasonId=329&teamId=15887061
http://www.alamy.com/stock-photo-gabriela-patricia-chavez-r-of-argentina-battles-for-the-ball-with-118827826.html

1989 births
Living people
Women's association football midfielders
Argentine women's footballers
Footballers from Buenos Aires
Argentina women's international footballers
2007 FIFA Women's World Cup players
2019 FIFA Women's World Cup players
Olympic footballers of Argentina
Footballers at the 2008 Summer Olympics
Pan American Games silver medalists for Argentina
Pan American Games medalists in football
Footballers at the 2019 Pan American Games
Footballers at the 2007 Pan American Games
Footballers at the 2011 Pan American Games
San Lorenzo de Almagro (women) players
Independiente (women) players
Boca Juniors (women) footballers
UAI Urquiza (women) players
Platense (women) players
Club Atlético River Plate (women) players
Medalists at the 2019 Pan American Games